Betty Astor (21 April 1905 – 1972) was a German film actress. She was born Berta Baesel in Germany.

Selected filmography
 Upstairs and Downstairs (1925)
 Should We Be Silent? (1926)
 The Transformation of Dr. Bessel (1927)
 Two Under the Stars (1927)
 The Green Alley (1928)
 Docks of Hamburg (1928)
 Folly of Love (1928)
 Hurrah! I Live! (1928)
 Love in May (1928)
 Who Invented Divorce? (1928)
 Once at Midnight (1929)
 Roses Bloom on the Moorland (1929)
 Masks (1929)
 The Third Confession (1929)
 Oh Those Glorious Old Student Days (1930)
 Gigolo (1930)
 Shooting Festival in Schilda (1931)

Bibliography
 Jung, Uli & Schatzberg, Walter. Beyond Caligari: The Films of Robert Wiene. Berghahn Books, 1999.

External links

1905 births
1972 deaths
German film actresses
German silent film actresses
20th-century German actresses